Burtrum is a city in Todd County, Minnesota, United States. The population was 144 at the 2010 census.

History
Burtrum was platted in 1884. A post office has been in operation at Burtrum since 1888. Burtrum was incorporated in 1901.

Geography

Minnesota State Highway 28 serves as a main route in the community.

Demographics

2010 census
As of the census of 2010, there were 144 people, 63 households, and 38 families living in the city. The racial makeup of the city was 98.6% White and 1.4% from two or more races. Hispanic or Latino of any race were 1.4% of the population.

There were 63 households, of which 31.7% had children under the age of 18 living with them, 38.1% were married couples living together, 15.9% had a female householder with no husband present, 6.3% had a male householder with no wife present, and 39.7% were non-families. 34.9% of all households were made up of individuals, and 12.7% had someone living alone who was 65 years of age or older. The average household size was 2.29 and the average family size was 2.89.

The median age in the city was 39.3 years. 27.8% of residents were under the age of 18; 6.3% were between the ages of 18 and 24; 23.1% were from 25 to 44; 23.7% were from 45 to 64; and 19.4% were 65 years of age or older. The gender makeup of the city was 49.3% male and 50.7% female.

2000 census
As of the census of 2000, there were 146 people, 69 households, and 38 families living in the city. The racial makeup of the city was 99.32% White, and 0.68% from two or more races.

There were 69 households, out of which 26.1% had children under the age of 18 living with them, 46.4% were married couples living together, 7.2% had a female householder with no husband present, and 43.5% were non-families. 36.2% of all households were made up of individuals, and 8.7% had someone living alone who was 65 years of age or older. The average household size was 2.12 and the average family size was 2.77.

In the city, the population was spread out, with 21.2% under the age of 18, 14.4% from 18 to 24, 24.0% from 25 to 44, 26.0% from 45 to 64, and 14.4% who were 65 years of age or older. The median age was 40 years. For every 100 females, there were 105.6 males. For every 100 females age 18 and over, there were 113.0 males.

The median income for a household in the city was $26,875, and the median income for a family was $38,125. Males had a median income of $25,833 versus $20,000 for females. The per capita income for the city was $13,788. There were 4.9% of families and 12.4% of the population living below the poverty line, including 11.4% of under eighteens and 8.7% of those over 64.

References

Cities in Minnesota
Cities in Todd County, Minnesota